Sea Princesses  (known as Princesas do Mar in Brazil) is a series of children's books created by the Brazilian writer and cartoonist Fábio Yabu. The first book was released in 2004 by publisher Panda Books; due to its success, three other books were made.

In 2007, it was adapted into an Australian-Spanish-Brazilian cartoon produced by the Spanish studio Neptuno Films and the Australian distributor Southern Star Entertainment. It was broadcast in 50 countries including France on Piwi+, Germany on KiKa, Spain on Disney Junior, Portugal on RTP2 ZigZag, South Africa on K-T.V., Italy on Rai 2 (On Playhouse Disney block) & Rai Gulp and United Kingdom on Disney Junior & Tiny Pop. It aired in the United States in Discovery Familia from 2007 to 2013, dubbed into Latin American Spanish. As of today the show is still available on Amazon Prime Video for streaming and is also on Pluto TV.

Plot 
The stories are in the world of Salacia, a hidden kingdom under the sea, full of princes and princesses from different animal species. Fearing an inevitable conflict with the people of Terra Firma, the kings and queens of the sea forbid their daughters and sons to have any contact with the surface people who are completely unaware of the existence of Salacia. Three princesses, the show's protagonists, live, go to school and play together as friends: Polvina, the Octopus Kingdom princess; Tubarina, the Shark Kingdom princess and Ester, the Starfish Kingdom princess living unraveling the mysteries of Salacia.

Characters

Main 
Polvina (Pulpita in European Spanish and Pulpina in Latin Spanish) – She is the pink Sea Princess of the Octopus. Polvina is a quiet and peaceful girl, timid as octopuses. Her best friends are Ester and Tubarina, who always live great adventures. She is voiced by Isabella Dunwill.
Ester (Estella in European Spanish) – She is the yellow Sea Princess of the Starfish, and best friend of Polvina. She usually attends the Palace of the Octopus from time to time, especially after school and on weekends. Ester is a very curious girl, loves to read and watch documentaries on television. She dreams to know the Mainland and also the Star-heaven. She is voiced by Katherine Cohn Beck.
Tubarina (Tiburina in European and Latin Spanish) – She is the blue Sea Princess of the Sharks, and daughter of one of the most powerful men in Salacia, King Shark. Tubarina is very ingenious, and disagrees with the common stereotype that sharks are evil. She is voiced by Paige Walker.

Others
Marcelo – He is the Prince of Hammerhead Sharks, and cousin to Tubarina. He moved to Castle Sharks while his parents, the King and Queen Hammerhead, make an important trip. Marcelo likes to tease girls and is always the first in sports competitions. Occasionally, he fights with Tubarina, but deep down they are like siblings.
Bia (Bea) – She is the princess of the Abyssal Kingdom, responsible for maintaining order in Beyondness sea and take care of the throne while her parents are travel throughout the kingdom. She carries a scepter of light and unlike the other princesses only study the night school of the sea. She is very fond of Polvina, Esther and Tubarina. She is voiced by Roslyn Oades.
Hugo – Is the Prince of Turtles, heir to the throne with his twin sister, Tata. Like Tata, Hugo loves sports, especially the radicals. He is the best friend of Marcelo's cousin Tubarina, which always leads to their confusion.
Marli (Marley) – She is the Princess of Swordfish, an arrogant girl and  rival to Esther,  wanting to overcome her at school and at any activity. However she is a good girl despite all this. In the books she is basically the opposite being a shy, quiet girl. Her crown is a cheerful swordfish hooked in her hair.
Isa – The Princess of the Penguins. She is the only student from the School of the Sea which does not live underwater; she lives in the South Pole, the Kingdom of Penguins. Isa was afraid of water, but with the help of Santa Claus, she overcame her fear and today she wears a small fondly Santa-Claus helper hat on her crown.
Elektra - The princess of the Electric Eels
Julie and Jessie - The sister princesses of the Clown Fish
Matilda - The princess of the Hawkfish 
Dinho - The prince of the Blowfish 
 Mauricio - The prince of the Sea Urchins
Goldina - The princess of the Goldfish
Agostina - The princess of the Lobsters
Socita - The princess of the Grouper Fish 
Viva - The princess of the Jellyfish
Carlos - The prince of the Salmon
Marcela - Marcelo's sister and princess of the Hammerhead Sharks
Soraya - The princess of the Stingray
Janue - The princess of the Blue Lyretail 
Vito - Tubarina's brother and prince of the Sharks
Camerelo - The prince of the Snails
Cirilo - The prince of the Crabs
Leia - The princess of the Whales
Angelica - The princess of the Angelfish
Lia - The princess of the Lionfish 
Camarina - The princess of the Shrimp 
Tata - Hugo's sister and princess of the Sea Turtles
Delfi - The princess of the Dolphins
Ms. Marla - The teacher of Salacia's school
Duante - A traveler who helps sick fish in need.

TV series
The series made its debut in the United States on Discovery Family & Discovery Junior (Syndication). In Latin America, it was broadcast on Discovery Kids. In 2010, the series debuted on Nick Jr. in Australia before being rerun on free-to-air television by the Seven Network. It has been confirmed than the series will also debut on Treehouse. In 2017, the series debuted on Tiny Pop and Disney Junior in United Kingdom. All characters speak in American accents despite being played by Australian actors.

Episodes

Season 1
 Lost
 The Pearl
 The Boy
 The Golden Penguins
 The Royal Ball
 The Biggest Fish
 The Diary
 The Toy
 The Missing Crown
 The Babysitters
 The Return
 Homeless
 The Monster
 The Party
 Art
 The Picture
 The New Pet
 Stage Fright
 The Argument
 The Silence
 The Excuse
 The Race
 The Rescue
 Who's Who
 Sharing
 Tubarina Almighty
 The Ticklish Octopus
 Shooting Star
 The Trick
 The Big Game
 One Too Many
 The Hammerheads
 Big Brother
 The Lost Kingdom
 The Gift
 The Crush
 The Head Top
 The Dingleberry Mystery
 The Makeover
 The Doll
 Best Friends
 The New Teacher
 The Big Chill
 A Weighty Problem
 The Brave Turtle
 The Dare
 The Great Escape
 The Carnival
 The Missing Princess
 Lunch Power
 The Angel Fish
 Ester's Fear

Season 2
 The Matchmaker
 The New Princess
 The Dancing
 Bad Vibrations
 Rumours
 Battle of the Bands
 The Runaway Grandmother
 The Bad Princess
 The Sick Dolphin
 Size Matters
 Polvina the Teacher
 The Pirates
 A Little Help
 A Big Mess
 Marcello's Friend
 The Mural
 The Forbidden Reef
 The Accident
 The Birds
 The Ring
 The Whale Watchers
 The Guardians
 Friends Forever
 The Secret Admirer
 Princess Poutalot
 The Piano Lesson
 Shark Love
 The Twins
 The Treasure
 The Giant Starfish
 Magic
 The Seaweed Potion
 The Itchy Wrists
 The Bite
 The Surprise Party
 Grow Up
 What's Cooking
 The Ester Breakout
 The Ungrateful Fish
 The Too-Playful Shark
 The Scare
 Deep Freeze
 The Sweet Talker
 The Sea Quake
 The Spidercrabs
 The True Princess
 The Crack of Doom
 The Healer
 The Guilty
 The Number Crunchers
 Beauty
 The Last One

References

External links
 Animated series' site
 Animated series' site (in Spanish)

Seven Network original programming
Australian children's animated adventure television series
Australian children's animated comedy television series
Brazilian children's animated adventure television series
Brazilian children's animated comedy television series
British children's animated adventure television series
British children's animated comedy television series
Spanish children's animated adventure television series
Spanish children's animated comedy television series
2007 Australian television series debuts
2010 Australian television series endings
2000s Australian animated television series
2010s Australian animated television series
Television series by Endemol Australia
Television shows based on children's books
2000s British animated television series
2010s British animated television series
2000s British children's television series
2010s British children's television series
2007 British television series debuts
2010 British television series endings
2007 Spanish television series debuts
2010 Spanish television series endings
Australian Broadcasting Corporation original programming
Animated television series about children
Mermaids in television
Fictional mermen and mermaids
English-language television shows